is a spin-off video game in the Pokémon series for the Wii, developed by Creatures Inc., published by The Pokémon Company and distributed by Nintendo. It was released on December 5, 2009, in Japan, on July 9, 2010, in Europe, on September 23, 2010, in Australia, and on November 1, 2010, in North America.

It was re-released on the Wii U's eShop service in Europe and Australia on July 16, 2015.

Plot

One day, while playing with Charmander, Chikorita and Piplup, Pikachu is sent to the PokéPark, where the Mythical Pokémon Mew tells him that the 14 pieces of the Sky Prism that protects the park, which has shattered, have gone missing. With his friends, Pikachu sets out on an adventure to find them in the PokéPark, which encompasses various zones such as the meadow and lava zones. Pikachu makes friends with other Pokémon and can use their abilities to clear various attractions in the PokéPark. By clearing attractions, the player will obtain pieces of the Sky Prism; after receiving all of the pieces, Pikachu must play a difficult game of obstacle hop with Mew, then he must battle with it and finally play a game of chase; after all this everything is solved and the PokéPark goes back to the friendly and peaceful state.

In battle, Pikachu is able to use Thunderbolt, Dash and eventually Iron Tail; these can be upgraded to become more powerful. Also, he can jump and do a flip to knock his enemy into a river, lake, etc.

Features
Players can make friends through various mini-games as well, such as playing Battle, Hide & Seek, Chase, playing Obstacle Hop, or by completing a quiz. Some of the park's main attractions will involve Pikachu and his/her partner Pokémon racing against the clock to beat certain goals or deflecting rocks to earn points using the Wii Remote by waving it around and pushing buttons. Players also can take screenshots of the game and save them to an SD Card or the Wii Message Board.

Development
On October 10, 2009, Nintendo revealed the game with a release date of December 5, 2009, in Japan. On May 27, 2010, the game was revealed in Europe and was released on July 9, 2010. Nintendo revealed the game in America during E3 2010 and it was released on November 1, 2010.

Sequel

On September 12, 2011, a sequel, PokéPark 2: Wonders Beyond was revealed. It was released on November 12, 2011, in Japan as PokéPark 2: BW - Beyond the World. It was released on February 27, 2012, in North America and on March 23, 2012, in Europe.

Reception

PokéPark Wii: Pikachu's Adventure has received mixed reviews. It has a Metacritic score of 62/100 and a GameRankings score of 64.80%.

IGN gave the game one of its more positive reviews of 7.5 or "good", citing some occasional control issues and a childish story as its main flaws. The Guardian gave it some praise as well, saying that the "graphics are bright and the music suitably bouncy throughout".

GameSpot gave it 5.5, criticizing an absent multiplayer and dull minigames. Nintendo Life gave it 4 out of 10, citing lacking challenge and repetitive gameplay.

References

External links
 Official site
 Official site 
 Official game page 

2009 video games
Action-adventure games
Wii games
Wii games re-released on the Nintendo eShop
Video games about mice and rats
Video games developed in Japan
Open-world video games
Video games set in amusement parks
Pokémon spin-off games